Trachypachus is a genus of beetles in the family Trachypachidae that contains four described species. Below is a list of species:

Trachypachus holmbergi
Trachypachus gibbsii
Trachypachus zetterstedi
Trachypachus slevini

References

 George E. Ball, "Trachypachidae", in Ross H. Arnett, Jr. and Michael C. Thomas, American Beetles (CRC Press, 2001), vol. 1

Adephaga genera
Beetles of South America